The 1956 Critérium du Dauphiné Libéré was the 10th edition of the Critérium du Dauphiné Libéré cycle race and was held from 8 June to 17 June 1956. The race started and finished in Grenoble. The race was won by Alex Close.

General classification

References

1956
1956 in French sport
June 1956 sports events in Europe